Alice Trübner (1875–1916) was a German artist.

Biography 
Trübner née Auerbach was born on 24 August 1875 in Bradford, England. She was the wife of the painter Wilhelm Trübner (1851–1917). Trübner exhibited her work in Berlin. She died on 20 March 1916 in Berlin Germany.

Her work is in the collection of the collection of the Städel. Her work is also in the German Expressionism collection of the Museum of Modern Art. Specifically MoMA has two lithographs that were contributions to the weekly broadside Kriegszeit (Wartime) published by Paul Cassirer from 1914 through 1916.

Gallery

References

External links

1875 births
1916 deaths
Artists from Bradford
19th-century German women artists
20th-century German women artists